The Church of Santa María (Lebeña) (Spanish: Iglesia de Santa María (Lebeña)) is a medieval building located in Cillorigo de Liébana, Spain. 
The architectural style is Pre-Romanesque.

Conservation 
It is classed as a Bien de Interés Cultural and has been protected since 1893.

References

See also 

 List of Bien de Interés Cultural in Cantabria

Bien de Interés Cultural landmarks in Cantabria
Churches in Cantabria
Pre-Romanesque architecture in Spain